In enzymology, a ribosyldihydronicotinamide dehydrogenase (quinone) is an enzyme that catalyzes the chemical reaction

1-(beta-D-ribofuranosyl)-1,4-dihydronicotinamide + a quinone  1-(beta-D-ribofuranosyl)nicotinamide + a hydroquinone

Thus, the two substrates of this enzyme are 1-(beta-D-ribofuranosyl)-1,4-dihydronicotinamide and quinone, whereas its two products are 1-(beta-D-ribofuranosyl)nicotinamide and hydroquinone.

This enzyme belongs to the family of oxidoreductases, specifically those acting on diphenols and related substances as donor with other acceptors.  The systematic name of this enzyme class is 1-(beta-D-ribofuranosyl)-1,4-dihydronicotinamide:quinone oxidoreductase. Other names in common use include NRH:quinone oxidoreductase 2, NQO2, NQO2, NAD(P)H:quinone oxidoreductase-2 (misleading), QR2, quinone reductase 2, N-ribosyldihydronicotinamide dehydrogenase (quinone), and NAD(P)H:quinone oxidoreductase2 (misleading).

References

 
 
 
 

EC 1.10.99
Enzymes of unknown structure